The People's Liberation Army of Namibia (PLAN) was the military wing of the South West Africa People's Organisation (SWAPO). It fought against the South African Defence Force (SADF) and South West African Territorial Force (SWATF) during the South African Border War. Throughout its history, PLAN had both irregular insurgent and semi-conventional units, as well as an extensive recruitment network in rural South West Africa (Namibia). During the war most of its domestic activities consisted of mine warfare and acts of sabotage. PLAN initially lacked any standing units, and the bulk of operations were carried out by political exiles who spent cyclical periods residing in refugee camps in neighbouring states before launching raids inside South West Africa itself. By the end of the war, PLAN had 32,000 militants under arms, including three battalions of semi-conventional troops equipped with heavy weapons.

PLAN launched its largest and final offensive between late April and early March 1989. Thereafter, it ceased operations due to the ongoing peace process in South West Africa and withdrew to above the 16th parallel south. The bulk of PLAN's forces were disarmed and demobilized on its Angolan camps in late 1989 by the United Nations Transitional Assistance Group (UNTAG) and repatriated to South West Africa. A small number remained in reserve until after Namibian independence, when they were also repatriated. The last PLAN troops and equipment were returned to Namibia in mid-1990 for integration with the new Namibian Defence Force (NDF).

Nomenclature
SWAPO's military wing was founded as the South West Africa Liberation Army (SWALA) in 1962. On 12 June 1968, the United Nations General Assembly adopted a resolution which proclaimed that, in accordance with the desires of its people, South West Africa be renamed "Namibia". Thereafter, SWAPO started using the term "Namibia" more frequently in its political discourse, and SWALA began to be referred to as the Namibian People's Army (NPA). It was not until 1973 that SWALA was formally renamed the People's Liberation Army of Namibia (PLAN). The title may have been adopted informally or semi-formally as early as 1969.

History

Background

The German Empire had administered Namibia as the colony of German South West Africa during the late nineteenth century. During World War I, South African troops under General Louis Botha occupied the colony and deposed the German colonial administration. The end of the war and the Treaty of Versailles left South Africa in possession of South West Africa under a League of Nations mandate. Under the terms of the mandate, the South African government was only permitted to administer South West Africa until its inhabitants were prepared for their own political self-determination. However, South Africa interpreted the mandate as a veiled annexation and made no attempt to prepare South West Africa for future autonomy.

During the late 1950s and early 1960s, pressure for global decolonisation and national self-determination began mounting on the African continent; these factors had a radical impact on South West African nationalism. Early nationalist organisations such as the South West African National Union (SWANU) and South West African People's Organisation (SWAPO) made determined attempts to establish indigenous political structures for an independent South West Africa. SWAPO first discussed the possibility of armed struggle at its party conference in Rehoboth in 1961. In March 1962, SWAPO president Sam Nujoma made the decision to begin recruiting South West Africans and send them for guerrilla training overseas.

Origins
SWAPO's decision to take up arms against the South African government may be linked to a variety of political factors. The success of indigenous anti-colonial guerrilla movements in French Indochina and French Algeria had the effect of encouraging nationalist parties to take up arms against colonial powers elsewhere. Furthermore, the armed revolution figured prominently in the rhetoric of Africa's leading statesmen at the time, such as Ahmed Ben Bella, Gamal Abdel Nasser, and Julius Nyerere, to whom these parties looked to for political inspiration. SWAPO's first attempt to recruit guerrillas also coincided with uprisings against colonial rule in several neighbouring territories, namely Angola.

Yet another incentive appeared when the Organisation of African Unity (OAU) formed a Liberation Committee for the purpose of encouraging anti-colonial movements. The Liberation Committee collected approximately £20,000 in contributions from OAU member states; these funds were promised to any South West African party on the condition they would use them for the express purpose of armed struggle. SWANU was denied the funds because it refused this condition. Accordingly, all the money was given to SWAPO. Most SWAPO members had studied in South Africa, where they had been radicalised by the activities of the African National Congress (ANC), namely the 1952 Defiance Campaign. They decided to model the movement's new military wing on that established by the ANC, Umkhonto we Sizwe.

Beginning in March 1962 Nujoma dispatched two recruiters, Lucas Pohamba and Elia Muatale, to Ovamboland, where SWAPO's traditional political base was located. Pohamba and Muatale succeeded in recruiting hundreds of volunteers for a new guerrilla army, which was subsequently named the South West African Liberation Army (SWALA). SWALA's headquarters was established in Dar es Salaam, the capital of Tanzania, which was sympathetic to SWAPO's cause. The Tanzanian government permitted SWALA to set up a training camp at Kongwa, where the volunteers would receive guerrilla training. The Soviet Union, Ghana, Egypt, Algeria, North Korea, and the People's Republic of China all offered free training programmes for SWALA recruits, provided they were able to make the necessary travel arrangements. The first seven SWALA recruits were sent to Egypt for training that year. These were Tobias Hainyeko, John Nankudhu, Vilho Haitembu, Titus Muailepeni Shitilifa, Patrick Israel Iyambo, Petrus Hambija and Lazarus Sakaria. They were also trained as company commanders so they could train and lead new recruits upon their return to Kongwa. Two years later, twelve recruits were sent to Ghana for six months of training. Other recruits were sent to Algeria, where they received eight months of basic instruction in small arms, explosives, laying land mines, radio communications, and political theory. SWALA personnel selected for more specialised instruction were sent to the Soviet Union. By 1965, there were also SWALA recruits undergoing training in North Korea and the People's Republic of China.

Most of the SWALA's support came from socialist nations. However, SWALA representatives also requested direct support from the United States and other Western states through their respective embassies in Dar es Salaam. During the 1940s, the US and South African governments had clashed over the latter's nettlesome attempts to annex South West Africa as a fifth province. The US had consistently voted against annexation proposals in the United Nations and even urged the International Court of Justice to deliver an advisory opinion opposed to South African territorial ambitions. Its postwar anti-colonial rhetoric made it a potentially important source of anti-colonial support, and for a time Washington was a major stop for nationalist leaders touring the world for benefactors. But when campaigning for official or private US aid, anti-colonial movements found that anti-communist credentials were valued above all others. SWAPO's Marxist style rhetoric and promises of ending foreign exploitation of South West Africa's resources did little to endear it to the US, which had significant investments in the territory. Additionally, the US government argued that change could only come if the colonial governments assented to a peaceful political transition, and therefore discouraged black Africans from seeking political rights through violence.

One consequence of this attitude was that SWALA followed most other African anti-colonial armies in becoming more definitively oriented towards the Soviet bloc and adopting forms of national liberation movement ideology. This radicalisation helped reinforce a wider shift to the left in Third World politics and made the Soviet Union the more credible of the superpowers in anti-colonial causes. For its part, the Soviet Union approved of SWAPO's decision to adopt guerrilla warfare because it was not optimistic about any solution to the South West African problem short of revolutionary struggle. It also possessed a marked antipathy towards the South African government, which Moscow viewed as a regional Western ally and a bastion of neocolonialism. There was a more practical segment to the Soviet relationship with SWALA: the Soviet government hoped that the cultivation of socialist client states on the African  continent would deny their economic and strategic resources to the West. The training courses SWALA recruits underwent in the Soviet Union included extensive political instruction in Marxist theory.

In 1963, SWALA began receiving PPSh-41 submachine guns and TT pistols from Algeria and the Soviet Union. In September 1965, the first cadre of six SWALA guerrillas, identified simply as "Group 1", departed the Kongwa refugee camp to infiltrate South West Africa. SWALA's strategy at this point was to conduct passive reconnaissance and focus on the politicisation of the rural populace in Ovamboland as opposed to seeking out engagements with the South African security forces. Encouraged by South Africa's apparent failure to detect the initial incursion, larger cadres made their own infiltration attempts in February and March 1966. The second cadre, "Group 2", was led by Leonard Philemon Shuuya, also known by the nom de guerre "Castro" or "Leonard Nangolo". The insurgents travelled from Tanzania to Zambia, then crossed into the Caprivi Strip and set off on foot towards Ovamboland. The incursion in February was a failure, as the insurgents accidentally crossed into Angola and became involved with an altercation with two local shopkeepers there. Three were subsequently arrested by the Portuguese authorities in that country. Their capture alerted the South African government to SWALA's presence, and the South African Police (SAP) successfully intercepted the guerrillas involved in the March incursion in Kavangoland. SWAPO sources maintain that some of those captured by the police were later permitted to escape and make their way back to Kongwa, albeit as South African informants.

Early activities

In September 1965, SWALA established its first training camp on South West African soil, at Omugulugwombashe, one of five potential bases identified by SWALA's initial reconnaissance team as appropriate sites to recruit and drill more insurgents. At the time, SWALA numbered only about 250 personnel, most of whom were still undergoing training at Kongwa. The insurgents at Omugulugwombashe succeeded in recruiting only about 30 locals before the location of their camp was reported to the SAP. Three policemen discreetly visited the site on August 23, 1966, and confirmed that the insurgents were there. The SAP requested military assistance, and the South African Defence Force (SADF) was able to mobilise a small force of paratroops to attack the camp. Paramilitary officers of the SAP's Reaction Unit were also flown into South West Africa for the raid. The attack on Omugulugwombashe commenced on August 26, with the paratroops and policemen rappelling into the camp from eight SADF Aérospatiale Alouette III helicopters on loan to the SAP. The SWALA camp was destroyed and the insurgents suffered 2 dead, 1 seriously wounded, and 8 captured. This was the first engagement of what became known as the South African Border War.

The South African government subsequently arrested 37 of SWAPO's most prominent leaders and tried them, along with the captured SWALA insurgents, on charges of terrorism and armed insurrection. The defence counsel argued that because SWAPO did not recognise South Africa's administration of South West Africa as legitimate, its members could not be tried under South African laws by a South African court. The court rejected this opinion, and at least 20 of the detainees were given life sentences, while another 9 were given twenty year sentences.

Despite this setback, SWALA remained under pressure from the SWAPO leadership and pan-African strategists on the OAU Liberation Committee to establish "liberated zones" or "semi-liberated zones" in South West Africa. This strategy depended on the insurgents being able to seize and hold static positions, from which they could recruit more insurgents and receive supplies. However, SWALA remained stymied by its own over-extended logistics and geographic circumstances which made landing groups of armed partisans along the shoreline impossible. This forced the movement to continue sending cadres into South West Africa on long overland treks through Zambia, during which they had to cross through the Caprivi Strip, a region which was heavily monitored by the SAP for precisely this reason. From 1966 until the disintegration of Portuguese colonial rule in Angola during the mid 1970s, all of SWALA's infiltration attempts were made through the Caprivi Strip. The incursions were almost wholly unsuccessful.

The arrest of so much of SWAPO's internal leadership in mid 1966 effectively decapitated SWALA at the command level for months. It was not until December 1966 that the movement attempted to launch another major raid into South West Africa, this time further to the south near Grootfontein. The SAP began carrying its own search and destroy operations to locate the insurgents after they attacked a white farmer. Again, extensive SADF assistance was utilised, in the form of aircraft on loan and counter-insurgency advisers. The South African government was initially reluctant to view SWALA's activities as a military problem, reflecting a trend among Anglophone Commonwealth states to regard the police as the principal force in the suppression of insurgencies.

SWALA suffered a second major reversal on 18 May 1967, when its commander, Tobias Hainyeko, attempted to lead a reconnaissance team into the Caprivi as part of a general survey aimed at opening new lines of communication between the front lines in South West Africa and SWALA's headquarters in Dar es Salaam. Heinyeko was intercepted by an SAP patrol, which killed him after a brief firefight. The SAP later tracked and killed another 5 insurgents, with 4 managing to escape back into Zambia. After this catastrophe, SWALA considered abandoning the Zambian front and opening up a new infiltration route through Botswana. In December 1969, a group of insurgents were intercepted by the SAP shortly after crossing the Botswana border and 4 were killed.

Organization

SWAPO Military Council
The SWAPO Military Council was the highest decision-making body of the People's Liberation Army of Namibia (PLAN). The council was constituted in 1977 and met once a year to review the political and military situation and the progress of the war. It drew up strategies for the operations conducted by PLAN during the liberation struggle. The Military Council was one of SWAPO's most solid branches during the liberation struggle. Its members were either regional commanders or political commissars while others were chosen by merit of their vast experience in the struggle. They were instrumental in creating the Operational Command Headquarters which was situated in Lumbango. The council was established under the leadership of Peter Nanyemba who served as the first SWAPO Secretary of Defence. Nanyemba was delegated by the President to chair the council for the first five years until he, as the Commander-in-Chief, and as per requirement of both SWAPO Constitution and PLAN manual took over.

Operational Command Headquarters
The Operational Command Headquarters was a highest level military command within PLAN consisting of the commander of PLAN and its deputy, PLAN chief political commissar, chief of staff, and all other departments within PLAN. SWAPO had developed structures to manage and control its armed wing, structurally, the Central Committee and the National Executive controlled the army.

The party president was also the Commander-in-Chief of PLAN and chairman of the SWAPO Military Council. Under the president, a deputy chief commander was also the commander of the army, being responsible for all PLAN operations and activities. Below the commander was the Secretary of Defence, who was in charge of logistical operations. He reported to and advised the National Executive. Military operations were organised by the commanders of the different regions, who were responsible for making recommendations to the Secretary of Defence.

Command structure
The command structure of PLAN consisted of: 
 PLAN Commander: Dimo Hamaambo
 PLAN Deputy Commander: Solomon Hauala
 PLAN Chief-of-Staff: Charles Ndaxu Namoloh
 PLAN Chief of Operations: Martin Shalli 
 PLAN Chief of Reconnaissance: Isaak "Pondo" Shikongo
 PLAN Chief of Intelligence: James Auala
 PLAN Chief of Counter Intelligence: Israel Patrick Iyambo "Lunganda" 
 PLAN Chief of Artillery: Kristoph Kala
 PLAN Chief of Engineering: Nande Shafombambi
 PLAN Chief of Air Defence: Andrew "Bongi" Intamba
 PLAN Chief of Logistics: Isaak Kapuleko
 PLAN Chief of Medical Health Services: Eloby Amundamba
 PLAN Chief of Communication: Augustus "McNamara" Nghaamwa
 PLAN Chief of Personnel: Patrick Mwinga
 PLAN Chief: Kayambu Erasmus Amupolo

Military regions
For administration purposes, the theater of operations was divided into four different military regions that were later called  "fronts", with each front having its own Regional Commander, assisted by a Political Commissar and a Chief of Staff as part of the front's Command structure.

Eastern Front
North-Eastern Front
Northern Front
North-Western Front

The Eastern Front was the only military region located in Zambia while the North-Eastern, Northern and North-Western Fronts were located in Southern Angola.

Regional Commanders
The Eastern Front Front had these fighters as its Commander;
Absai Hanghome as founding Commander who then was succeeded by Joseph Amunyela wa Shalali and later Ehrenfried "Baby" Jeombe.

The North-Eastern Front Front had these fighters as its Commander;
Matias Mbulunganga Ndakolo as founding Commander who then was succeeded by George "Chicken" Kaxuxwena, Ruben "Danger Ashipala" & Ehrenfried "Baby" Jeombe.

The Northern Front had these fighters as its Commander;
Fillipus Nandenga "Zulu" as founding Commander who then was succeeded by Shilongo Elia, Nguluma Sheehama, Ehrenfried "Baby" Jeombe, Festus "Uudjuu wa Nangula" Hamukoto & Tomas "Mapaya" Shuuya.

The Northern-Western Front had these fighters as its Commander;
Wilbardt "Nakada" Tashiya as founding Commander who then was succeeded by Uuno "Kanana" Shaanika & Erastus "Zicky" Negonga.

Strategy
The first incursions were staged from Zambia into the Caprivi strip by combatants in the early 1960s. PLAN incursions from Angola into Namibia restarted in earnest after the Portuguese withdrawal from Angola in 1975. Infiltration began particularly after the first rains during the rainy season when conditions were favourable for the combatants. Vegetation was tall and this provided for cover. The Oshanas were filled with drinking water that combatants needed during the long treks from their Angolan bases into Namibia. The rain also washed away any foot tracks, which rendered follow-up operations by South African forces difficult. Once in Namibia combatants either planted Landmines, sabotaged administration infrastructure i.e. electricity pylons, ambushed South African Defence Force (SADF) convoys, or attacked SADF bases from a stand-off distance by using mortars.

Facilities
PLAN operated numerous base-camps and support facilities, which were initially set up across Southern Zambia and later in Southern Angola. Its main guerrilla training camps were located inside Angola, the Tobias Hainyeko Training Centre (THTC) and the Jumbo Training Centre (JTC), both located around Lubango. Due to the nature of guerrilla warfare, the PLAN did not have permanent bases located closer to the Namibian–Angolan border as compared to a conventional army. In reality, base-camps were set up on a temporary basis as the security situation changed every time.

Units
Main PLAN combat formations comprised:
1st Motorized Infantry Brigade
Moscow Battalion
Alpha Battalion 
Bravo Battalion 
8th Battalion
Salute Unit
Volcano unit – this was a special commando force that was trained to infiltrate the Farming areas south of Oshivelo.

Weapons and equipment
Besides enjoying political support and sanctuary from Ghana, Tanzania, Kenya, Zambia and Angola, the PLAN received military assistance mainly from Egypt, Algeria, Cuba, the Soviet Union, Poland, East Germany, Czechoslovakia, Hungary, Yugoslavia, North Korea and the People's Republic of China, who provided weapons, ammunition, vehicles and other non-lethal military equipment, such as field radios and uniforms.

Small-arms
Tokarev TT-33 pistol
Makarov PM pistol
CZ 75 pistol 
PPSh-41 submachine gun
PPS wz. 1943/1952 submachine gun
SKS semi-automatic rifle
AK-47 assault rifle
AKM assault rifle
Type 56 assault rifle
Vz. 52 rifle
ZB vz. 26
UK vz. 59
RPK light machine gun
RPD machine gun
PK machine gun
SG-43/SGM Goryunov medium machine gun 
DShkM 12.7mm Heavy machine gun 
M/52 sniper rifle
Dragunov SVD-63 sniper rifle

Grenade systems
F1 hand grenade
RG-4 anti-personnel grenade
RG-42 hand grenade
RGD-5 hand grenade
RPG-43 anti-tank grenade
PGN-60 anti-tank rifle grenade
M60 rifle grenade

Land mine systems
OZM-4 anti-personnel mine
PMD-6 anti-personnel mine
PMN-1/2 anti-personnel mine
POMZ-2/2M anti-personnel mine
PP Mi-D anti-personnel mine
PP Mi-BA anti-personnel mine
PP Mi-SR anti-personnel mine
PPM-2 anti-personnel mine
PMA-1 anti-personnel mine
PMA-2 anti-personnel mine
PMA-3 anti-personnel mine
PMR-1 anti-personnel mine
PMR-2A anti-personnel mine
PROM-1 anti-personnel mine
PT Mi-Ba-II anti-tank mine
PT Mi-Ba-III anti-tank mine
PT-MI-K anti-tank mine
TMA-2 anti-tank mine
TMA-3 anti-tank mine
TMA-4 anti-tank mine
TMA-5 anti-tank mine
TM-46 anti-tank mine
TM-57 anti-tank mine
TM-62B/M anti-tank mine
TMD-44 anti-tank mine
TMD-B anti-tank mine
TMK-2 anti-tank mine
UKA-63 anti-tank mine

Mortars
M57 60mm mortar
82-BM-41 (M-1937) 82mm mortar

Anti-tank rocket and grenade launchers
RPG-2 
RPG-7 
RPG-75

Anti-aircraft missiles
SA-7 Grail surface-to-air missile

Armored vehicles

Rocket systems and towed artillery

Notable former combatants

 Danger Ashipala
 Tobias Hainyeko
 Dimo Hamaambo
 Hidipo Hamutenya
 Fillipus Nandenga "Commander Zulu"
 Solomon Huwala "Jesus"
 Jesaya Elago Kambonde
 Richard Kamwi
 Julius Shaambeni Shilongo Mnyika (with PLAN's forerunner, South West African Liberation Army)
 Philemon Moongo
 Peter Mweshihange
 Peter Naholo
 Peter Nambundunga "Cosmos"
 Charles Ndaxu Namoloh "Ho Chi Minh"
 Peter Nanyemba "Ndlimani"
 Monica Nashandi
 Sakaria Nashandi
 John Pandeni
 Martin Shalli
 Helao Shityuwete
 Eliaser Tuhadeleni
 Ben Ulenga
 Kayambu Erasmus Amupolo
 Ben Kadhila
 John Mutwa
 Erastus Kashopola
 Matheus Alueendo
 Fiina Amupolo
 Joseph Kakoto
 Jesaya Elago Kambonde
 John Mutwa
 Epaphras Denga Ndaitwah
 Sinsy Nghipandua
 Martin Pinehas
 Nestor Shali Shalauda
 Tomas Hamunyela
 Wilbard Shikongo
 Peter Vilho
 Bernard Nkawa

See also
 People's Armed Forces for the Liberation of Angola, the military wing of MPLA.
 Umkhonto we Sizwe, the military wing of the African National Congress (ANC).
 South West Africa Territorial Force (SWATF), the military and security arm of the former South African administration.
 Namibian Defence Force (NDF), the current national military of Namibia.

Notes and references

Annotations

References

External links
Namibian camouflage patterns

PLAN
Military units and formations established in 1966
1966 establishments in South West Africa
Anti-Apartheid organisations
SWAPO
Guerrilla organizations
Military history of Namibia
Military wings of socialist parties